Local elections were held in Romania on 27 September 2020. Initially planned for June 2020, the emergence of the COVID-19 pandemic led the Government of Romania to postpone the elections to a date no later than 31 December 2020, and extending all the terms of the local offices due to expire on 5 June 2020. 

The aforementioned decision was deemed unconstitutional, and, in the end, a law was passed that extended the terms of the local officials up to 30 November 2020, and allowed the elections to be called by the Parliament, rather than by the Government, no later than that day. On 8 July 2020, the Parliament of Romania adopted a law setting the date of the elections on 27 September 2020.

Rules

Using a first past the post system, the following offices will be contested: 
 All commune, town, and city councils (Local Councils), and the Sectors Local Councils of Bucharest
 The 41 County Councils, and the Bucharest Municipal General Council
 The 41 Presidents of the County Councils
 All mayors
 Of the communes, cities, and municipalities
 Of the Sectors of Bucharest
 The General Mayor of The Municipality of Bucharest

Polls

Exit polls

Bucharest 

Notes

Constanța

Results 

|-
|- style="background-color:#C9C9C9"
! style="background-color:#E9E9E9;text-align:center;" colspan=2 rowspan=2 | Party
! style="background-color:#E9E9E9;text-align:center;" colspan=3 | Mayor of Bucharest (PGMB)
! style="background-color:#E9E9E9;text-align:center;" colspan=3 | Mayors (P)
! style="background-color:#E9E9E9;text-align:center;" colspan=3 | Local Councilsseats (CL)
! style="background-color:#E9E9E9;text-align:center;" colspan=3 | County Councilsseats (CJ)
|-
|- style="background-color:#C9C9C9"
! style="background-color:#E9E9E9;text-align:center;" |Votes
! style="background-color:#E9E9E9;text-align:center;" |%
! style="background-color:#E9E9E9;text-align:center;" |Seats
! style="background-color:#E9E9E9;text-align:center;" |Votes
! style="background-color:#E9E9E9;text-align:center;" |%
! style="background-color:#E9E9E9;text-align:center;" |Seats
! style="background-color:#E9E9E9;text-align:center;" |Votes
! style="background-color:#E9E9E9;text-align:center;" |%
! style="background-color:#E9E9E9;text-align:center;" |Seats
! style="background-color:#E9E9E9;text-align:center;" |Votes
! style="background-color:#E9E9E9;text-align:center;" |%
! style="background-color:#E9E9E9;text-align:center;" |Seats
|-
| 
| style="text-align:left;" | National Liberal Party ( - PNL)
| style="text-align:right;" |282,631
(USR PLUS)
| style="text-align:right;" |42.81%
(USR PLUS)
| style="text-align:right;" |1
| style="text-align:right;" |2,578,820
| style="text-align:right;" |34.58%
| style="text-align:right;" |1,232
| style="text-align:right;" |2,420,413
| style="text-align:right;" |32.88%
| style="text-align:right;" |14,182
| style="text-align:right;" |2,212,904
| style="text-align:right;" |30.76%
| style="text-align:right;" |474
|-
| 
| style="text-align:left;" | Social Democratic Party ( - PSD)
| style="text-align:right;" |250,690
| style="text-align:right;" |37.97%
| style="text-align:right;" |0
| style="text-align:right;" |2,262,791
| style="text-align:right;" |30.34%
| style="text-align:right;" |1,362
| style="text-align:right;" |2,090,777
| style="text-align:right;" |28.40%
| style="text-align:right;" |13,820
| style="text-align:right;" |1,605,721
| style="text-align:right;" |22.32%
| style="text-align:right;" |362
|-
| style="background-color:#00aae7 "|
| style="text-align:left;" | USR PLUS ( - USR PLUS)
| style="text-align:right;" |282,631
(PNL)
| style="text-align:right;" |42.81%
(PNL)
| style="text-align:right;" |1
| style="text-align:right;" |490,362
| style="text-align:right;" |6.58%
| style="text-align:right;" |28
| style="text-align:right;" |504,563
| style="text-align:right;" |6.85%
| style="text-align:right;" |1,207
| style="text-align:right;" |478,659
| style="text-align:right;" |6.65%
| style="text-align:right;" |65
|-
| 
| style="text-align:left;" | People's Movement Party  ( - PMP)
| style="text-align:right;" |72,556
| style="text-align:right;" |10.99%
| style="text-align:right;" |0
| style="text-align:right;" |353,005
| style="text-align:right;" |4.73%
| style="text-align:right;" |50
| style="text-align:right;" |420,791
| style="text-align:right;" |5.72%
| style="text-align:right;" |2,137
| style="text-align:right;" |423,147
| style="text-align:right;" |5.88%
| style="text-align:right;" |67
|-
| style="background-color: |
| style="text-align:left;" | PRO Romania ( - PRO RO)
| style="text-align:right;" |5,315
| style="text-align:right;" |0.80%
| style="text-align:right;" |0
| style="text-align:right;" |331,878
| style="text-align:right;" |4.45%
| style="text-align:right;" |36
| style="text-align:right;" |381,535
| style="text-align:right;" |5.18%
| style="text-align:right;" |1,885
| style="text-align:right;" |356,030
| style="text-align:right;" |4.95%
| style="text-align:right;" |56
|-
| 
| style="text-align:left;" | Democratic Alliance of Hungarians in Romania  ( - UDMR/RMDSZ)
| style="text-align:right;" |-
| style="text-align:right;" |-
| style="text-align:right;" |-
| style="text-align:right;" |299,334
| style="text-align:right;" |4.01%
| style="text-align:right;" |199
| style="text-align:right;" |362,442
| style="text-align:right;" |4.92%
| style="text-align:right;" |2,360
| style="text-align:right;" |379,924
| style="text-align:right;" |5.28%
| style="text-align:right;" |92
|-
| 
| style="text-align:left;" | Alliance of Liberals and Democrats ( - ALDE)
| style="text-align:right;" |9,892
| style="text-align:right;" |1.49%
| style="text-align:right;" |0
| style="text-align:right;" |124,649
| style="text-align:right;" |1.67%
| style="text-align:right;" |15
| style="text-align:right;" |189,665
| style="text-align:right;" |2.58%
| style="text-align:right;" |861
| style="text-align:right;" |209,411
| style="text-align:right;" |2.91%
| style="text-align:right;" |15
|-
| 
| style="text-align:left;" | Other political parties, independent contenders, and local alliances
| style="text-align:right;" |39,034
| style="text-align:right;" |5.91%
| style="text-align:right;" |0
| style="text-align:right;" |1,140,903
| style="text-align:right;" |15.30%
| style="text-align:right;" |282
| style="text-align:right;" |1,086,907
| style="text-align:right;" |14.76%
| style="text-align:right;" |3,448
| style="text-align:right;" |1,528,189
| style="text-align:right;" |21.24%
| style="text-align:right;" |209
|-
| style="text-align:left;" colspan = 2 | Total:
| style="text-align:right;" |660,118
| style="text-align:right;" |100
| style="text-align:right;" |1
| style="text-align:right;" |7,457,093
| style="text-align:right;" |100
| style="text-align:right;" |3,176
| style="text-align:right;" |7,361,818
| style="text-align:right;" |100
| style="text-align:right;" |39,900
| style="text-align:right;" |7,193,985
| style="text-align:right;" |100
| style="text-align:right;" |1,340
|-
| style="text-align:left;" colspan=20 | Notes
|-
| style="text-align:left;" colspan=20 | Sources: Romanian Permanent Electoral Authority
|-
|}

Deaths 
The former PMP mayor of Sadova, Eugen Safta, who had just gotten re-elected, suffered a heart attack and died. His death was declared on 28 September 2020, at 2 AM EEST.

Ion Aliman, the PSD mayor of Deveselu, was re-elected for a third term, despite having had died of COVID-19 10 days earlier. He received 1,020 votes, out of a total of 1,600. Until a term of partial elections will be held, the vice mayor will have acting mayor attributions.

Electoral maps

References 

Local election, 2020
2020 elections in Romania
September 2020 events in Romania
Romania